Dichocrocis fuscoalbalis is a moth in the family Crambidae. It was described by George Hampson in 1899. It is found in the area of the former province of Équateur in the Democratic Republic of the Congo and in Sierra Leone.

The larvae feed on Ixora coccinea.

References

Moths described in 1899
Spilomelinae
Moths of Africa